Grant Eric Bradburn (born 26 May 1966 in Hamilton, New Zealand) is a New Zealand cricket coach and former cricketer.

A tall right-arm off-spin bowler and lower-order batsman, Bradburn played seven Test matches and eleven One Day Internationals between 1990 and 2001. He also played domestically for Northern Districts for 16 seasons.

After retiring from playing, Bradburn coached Northern Districts and the New Zealand Under-19s. In April 2014, he was appointed head coach of Scotland.

He was the fielding coach of the Pakistan national cricket team from 2018 to 2021 and served as the head of High Performance Coaching at the National Cricket Academy in Lahore, Pakistan.

Playing career

Domestically Bradburn played for Northern Districts for 16 seasons. He was a tall Off Spinner who also batted in a number of positions from 1-8. Bradburn's most successful season came in 1989/90 season batting at number 4, promoting a debut call up to the NZ side to tour Pakistan in 1990.[2]

Bradburns international career seemed over when he was left out of the New Zealand side after the 1992/93 series in Sri Lanka, but he was recalled in 2000/01 at the age of 35 although without any great success.  In all, he played seven Test matches and 11 One-Day Internationals and ended his career as the player with most appearances for Northern Districts with 115 matches with 4614 runs at an average of 27.96.

Coaching career
After retirement he ran a family sports store along with coaching Northern Districts A. When Andy Moles was appointed the New Zealand coach in 2008, Bradburn filled the spot left by him as Northern Districts coach for the rest of the season. He was also head coach of New Zealand A and the Under-19 side.

In April 2014, Bradburn was named as Scotland's new head coach. His first major job was to get prepare them for 2015 World Cup.

Bradburn's appointment was until the end of 2017 and was extended until the end of 2018. On June 10th 2018, Bradburn coached Scotland to an historic 1st ever victory against England in a high scoring ODI at The Grange in Edinburgh.

In September 2018, Bradburn was named as Pakistan's new fielding coach for 3 years ahead of 2018 Asia cup. He resigned in October 2021, citing family reasons and pursuit of "further coaching opportunities".

Personal life

His father Wynne also played for Northern Districts and represented New Zealand in 2 Test matches.  He also owns a hockey/cricket shop.

References

1966 births
Living people
New Zealand cricket coaches
New Zealand cricketers
New Zealand Test cricketers
New Zealand One Day International cricketers
Northern Districts cricketers
Cricketers from Hamilton, New Zealand
Coaches of the Scotland national cricket team
New Zealand expatriate sportspeople in Pakistan